Harpago chiragra, common name the Chiragra spider conch, is a species of very large sea snail, a marine gastropod mollusk in the family Strombidae, the true conchs.

Shell description 

The shell length for this species varies between 85 mm and 320 mm, usually to 170 mm.
Harpago chiragra has a very thick, robust and heavy shell, with a distinct anterior notch. Its most prominent characteristic are the six long and curved marginal digitations, expanded from the flaring, thick outer lip and canals. The columella and aperture are lirate.

Anatomy 
Sexual dimorphism is strongly present in this species. Female individuals are usually much larger than the male ones.

Distribution 
Harpago chiragra is widely distributed in the Indo-Pacific, ranging from the Aldabra Atoll, Chagos, Mauritius, Mozambique, Sri Lanka and the Gulf of Bengal to eastern Polynesia. It ranges north as far as Taiwan and southern Japan, and south to New Caledonia and Australia.

Ecology

Habitat 
Harpago chiragra lives in coral reef areas. It can be found in littoral and sublittoral zones, in tidal pools and low tide levels to a depth of around 25 m.

Feeding habits 
Harpago chiragra is known to be an herbivore, feeding on plants and algae.

Human uses 
The flesh of H. chiragra is edible, and it is locally collected for food. The shell is used in shellcraft.

References 

 Dautzenberg, Ph. (1929). Mollusques testacés marins de Madagascar. Faune des Colonies Francaises, Tome III
 Walls, J.G. (1980). Conchs, tibias and harps. A survey of the molluscan families Strombidae and Harpidae. T.F.H. Publications Ltd, Hong Kong

External links 

 

Strombidae
Gastropods described in 1758
Taxa named by Carl Linnaeus